Hans Günter Merz, better known as HG Merz (born 1947 in Tailfingen) is a German architect and museum designer. He is the founder and director of hg merz architekten museumsgestalter, an architecture office that specializes in museum and exhibition design and in refurbishing listed buildings. The office has branches in Stuttgart and Berlin.

From 1993 to 2007, HG Merz was professor for exhibition design at the department of Visual Communication at the University of Applied Sciences in Pforzheim. From 2008 until 2014, he was professor for experimental design at the department of Architecture at Technische Universität Darmstadt. In 2014, he was awarded an honorary doctorate from TU Darmstadt.

HG Merz was president of the University Council of Bauhaus University Weimar from 2013 to 2017.

Awards (selection) 
 2003 German Architecture Award
 2006 Critics Choice Award Germany
 2011 German Design Award, Silver
 2011 red dot communication design award
 2012 Mies van der Rohe Prize, Nomination
 2013 Focus Open Gold
 2013 red dot communication design award

Projects (selection) 
 Zeppelin Museum Friedrichshafen  (1993–1996)
 Alte Nationalgalerie Berlin (1993–2001)
 Concentration Camp Sachsenhausen Memorial (1998–2005)
 Mercedes-Benz Museum Stuttgart (1999–2006)
 European School of Management and Technology, transformation of the former State Council of East Germany, Berlin (2003–2006)
 Bundeswehr Military History Museum Dresden (2003–2010)
 Rebuilding and refurbishment of Berlin State Library (2000– ca. 2015)
 Porsche Museum Stuttgart (2005–2008)
 Conversion of a former Stasi prison into Berlin-Hohenschönhausen Memorial, Berlin (2008–2012)
 Extension and general refurbishment of Berlin State Opera (2009–2015)
 new permanent exhibition at Ruhr Museum at UNESCO World Heritage Site Zeche Zollverein, Essen (2005–2010)
 Tirol Panorama Innsbruck (2007–2011)
 Kunstkammer of Museum of Art History Vienna (2010–2013)
 Richard-Wagner-Museum, Bayreuth (2011–2015)
 Maison des Fondateurs Audemars Piguet, together with Bjarke Ingels Group (2014- )
 Rilke and Russia, traveling exhibition for German Literature Archive, 2016–2018

Links 
 http://www.hgmerz.com
 http://www.germanarchitects.com

Endnotes 

20th-century German architects
1947 births
Living people
People from Böblingen (district)
Academic staff of Technische Universität Darmstadt
Bauhaus University, Weimar alumni